Nausibius is a genus of beetles in the family Silvanidae, containing the following species:

 Nausibius brevicornis Sharp
 Nausibius clavicornis Kugelann
 Nausibius gigas Grouvelle
 Nausibius grouvellei Sharp
 Nausibius inermis Grouvelle
 Nausibius ingens Grouvelle
 Nausibius major Zimmerman
 Nausibius repandus LeConte
 Nausibius sahlbergi Grouvelle
 Nausibius silvanoides Sharp
 Nausibius sinuatus Grouvelle
 Nausibius wagneri Grouvelle

References

Silvanidae